"Drop Me Off in Harlem" is a 1933 song composed during the Harlem Renaissance composed by Duke Ellington, with lyrics written by Nick Kenny.

A.H. Lawrence writes that the song originated from an off the cuff remark from Ellington. Nick Kenny had hailed a taxi, and offered to share it with Ellington. Kenny asked "Where to, Duke?", and Ellington replied "Drop me off at Harlem". Kenny then fashioned lyrics from Ellington's remark and presented him with them a few days later at the Cotton Club.

Notable recordings
Duke Ellington and his Orchestra, February 17, 1933
Ella Fitzgerald - Ella Fitzgerald Sings the Duke Ellington Songbook (1958)
Duke Ellington and Louis Armstrong on The Great Summit (1961, re released 2001) This recording appeared in the 1989 film Harlem Nights.
Richie Kamuca - Drop Me Off at Harlem (1975)
Ran Blake - Duke Dreams (1981)
Sun Ra - Nuclear War (1982)
George Shearing Quintet - "Back To Birdland" (Telarc 2001)

Lyrics 
(ORIGINAL VERSION)

Drop me off in Harlem

Any place in Harlem

There's someone waiting there

Who makes it seem like Heaven up in Harlem

I don't want your Dixie

You can keep your Dixie

There's no one down in Dixie

Who can take me 'way from my hot Harlem

Harlem has those southern skies,

They're in my baby's smile,

I idolize my baby's eyes

And classy up-town style

If Harlem moved to China,

I know of nothing finer,

Than to stow away on a 'plane some day

And have them drop me off in Harlem

Harlem has those southern skies,

They're in my baby's smile

I idolize my baby's eyes

And classy up-town style

If Harlem moved to China,

I know of nothing finer,

Than to stow away on a 'plane some day

And have them drop me off in Harlem

If Harlem moved to China

I know nothing finer than to be in Harlem

(ARMSTRONG VERSION)

Drop me off in Harlem

Yea, good ol' Harlem

You have your fun under the Harlem sun

So drop me off in Harlem

There's Duke Ellington up in Harlem

He writes all his tunes in Harlem

And old Satchmo's still swingin'

Way up in Harlem

All the cats are still up there

They're beatin' out those riffs

And Apollo of Puerto Rico

Will give you a great big lisp

Yes, drop me off in Harlem

Yea ma, beautiful Harlem

You get red beans and rice

It's very nice

Way up there in Harlem

Notes

See also
List of 1930s jazz standards

Songs with music by Duke Ellington
Songs about New York City
1930s jazz standards
1933 songs
Songs with lyrics by Nick Kenny (poet)
Jazz songs